The Black Sheep of the Family: The Anthology is a compilation album by English folk rock band Fat Mattress, released on 15 August 2000 by Castle Communications. It includes both of their albums plus bonus tracks. The album is named after "Black Sheep of the Family", a song written by Steve Hammond, initially released as the B-side to "Highway" in 1970.

Track listing

Tracks 1 to 10 are Fat Mattress album (1969)

Tracks 1 to 11 are Fat Mattress II album (1970)

References

Fat Mattress albums
2000 compilation albums
Albums produced by Noel Redding
Albums produced by Neil Landon
Castle Communications compilation albums